Prionapteryx neotropicalis is a moth in the family Crambidae. It is found in Argentina.

References

Ancylolomiini
Moths described in 1896